Pessi is a surname. People with this surname include:

 Benjamín Rojas Pessi (born 1985), Argentine actor and singer
 Giorgio Pessi, Italian World War I ace pilot
Ville Pessi (1902–1983), Finnish metalworker and politician

See also 
 Pessi and Illusia, a 1984 Finnish fantasy film